Coleophora subnivea is a moth of the family Coleophoridae. It is found in the Caucasus of Russia.

References

subnivea
Moths of Asia
Moths of Europe
Moths described in 1926